Eduarda (minor planet designation: 340 Eduarda) is a main belt asteroid that was discovered by German astronomer Max Wolf on 25 September 1892 in Heidelberg. It was named after German banker and amateur astronomer Heinrich Eduard von Lade.

Photometric observations of this asteroid at the Oakley Observatory in Terre Haute, Indiana, during 2006 gave a light curve with a period of 8.04 ± 0.02 hours and a brightness variation of 0.25 ± 0.03 in magnitude.

References

External links 
 Lightcurve plot of 340 Eduarda, Palmer Divide Observatory, B. D. Warner (2006)
 Asteroid Lightcurve Database (LCDB), query form (info )
 Dictionary of Minor Planet Names, Google books
 Asteroids and comets rotation curves, CdR – Observatoire de Genève, Raoul Behrend
 Discovery Circumstances: Numbered Minor Planets (1)-(5000) – Minor Planet Center
 
 

000340
Discoveries by Max Wolf
Named minor planets
000340
18920925